|}

The Chelmer Fillies' Stakes is a Listed flat horse race in Great Britain open to fillies aged three years. It is run over a distance of 6 furlongs at Chelmsford City in late April or early May.

The race was created as a new Listed race in 2019.

Winners

See also 
Horse racing in Great Britain
List of British flat horse races

References

Racing Post:
, 

Flat races in Great Britain
Chelmsford City Racecourse
Flat horse races for three-year-old fillies
Recurring sporting events established in 2019
2019 establishments in England